This is a list of seasons of Italian women's football team Fiorentina Women's FC, formerly known as ACF Firenze, which has been ACF Fiorentina's women's section since the 2015–16 season.

Summary

References

women's seasons
women
Fiorentina Women
Fiorentina